Tente may refer to:
 Tente International, a manufacturer of industrial casters and wheels
 Tente (toy), a line of construction toys made by Educa Borras

See also
 Tent (disambiguation)